J.D. Williams (born May 22, 1978) is an American actor known for his starring roles in the HBO television programs Oz as Kenny Wangler, The Wire as Bodie Broadus and Pootie Tang as Froggy, Surviving Family (2012) as Bobby, The Good Wife (2010-2015) as Dexter, and in the main cast of Saints & Sinners. He also starred in Blood Brother (2018) as Kayvon.

Early life
Williams was born in Newark, New Jersey. He attended Newark Arts High School, a performing arts public school in Newark. He portrayed a biracial 15-year-old dealing with racism and his father's infidelity in the play A.M. Sunday in late 2003 at Baltimore's Centerstage theater. He had a number of cameos and leading roles in R&B and hip-hop music videos between 2002 and 2005.

Career
Williams appeared in Homicide: Life on the Street, a show based on a book by The Wire creator David Simon, where he guest-starred as Casper in the episode "The Why Chromosome". He had a small guest starring role in The Sopranos episode "46 Long" as Special K, an incompetent stickup man and one of Brendan Filone's goons. He went on to play series regular, inmate Kenny Wangler, in the first four seasons of Oz. He then appeared in HBOs The Wire as Bodie Broadus, a Barksdale Organization drug dealer who slowly rises through the ranks throughout the seasons. In preparation for the role, he walked around Baltimore's inner city during the middle of the night a few days before the first taping; talking about this to AllHipHop, Williams stated "it was like 12 or 1:00 in the morning. I just threw on a black hoodie and walked around. I went to one of their hoods and watched that night. I learned not to do that no more, I was lucky I made it back that night." He is older than his character by 8 years.

According to his original HBO bio, he is credited with appearing in the film Graffiti Bridge, but a 2003 interview with AllHipHop revealed that Williams was not in the movie. The page no longer exists, however. Tevin Campbell filled the cameo role with which Williams was credited.

Williams has had leading roles or cameo appearances in a number of R&B and hip-hop music videos. He has appeared as himself, a love interest, and characters resembling his role as a drug dealer on The Wire.

In 2012, Williams had a major supporting role in the indie film Surviving Family as the ex-boyfriend of the main character. His character was a wounded veteran of the war in Iraq who had lost an eye in an IED attack and suffered from PTSD.

He has starred in a number of commercials, and played a delivery man in a FedEx commercial. He appeared as Lemond Bishop's Lieutenant "Dexter" in episodes of The Good Wife.

Filmography

Film/Movie

Television

Video games

References

External links

Living people
20th-century American male actors
21st-century American male actors
African-American male actors
American male film actors
American male television actors
Male actors from Newark, New Jersey
Newark Arts High School alumni
1978 births
20th-century African-American people
21st-century African-American people